Pierre Albrecht (1 January 1926 – 12 December 1971) was a Swiss basketball player. He competed in the men's tournament at the 1948 Summer Olympics.

References

External links
 

1926 births
1971 deaths
Swiss men's basketball players
Olympic basketball players of Switzerland
Basketball players at the 1948 Summer Olympics
Basketball players from New York City